The Goose River is a short river in the community of Goose River in Kings County, Prince Edward Island, Canada. It lies on the northeast shore of the province and flows  from its source in an unnamed field northwest to the Gulf of Saint Lawrence.

References

Landforms of Kings County, Prince Edward Island
Rivers of Prince Edward Island